This is a list of foreign-born football players who played for the New Zealand men's national football team.

Players

Alderney 
 Gordon Barker

Australia 
 Luke Adams
 Andrew Durante
 Liam Graham
 Ken Hough
 Dane Ingham
 Jai Ingham
 Luka Prelevic
 Tim Stevens

Burma 
 Colin Latimour

China 
 Arthur Leong

Cook Islands 
 Christian Bouckenooghe

Croatia 
 Adam Mitchell

England 
 Martin Akers
 Bobby Almond
 Brian Armstrong
 Ken Armstrong
 Ron Armstrong
 Keith Barton
 Joe Bell
 Malcolm Bland
 Keith Braithwaite
 Geoff Brand
 Dave Bright
 Tim Brown
 Henry Cameron
 Stan Cawtheray
 Duncan Cole
 Ted Cook
 Perry Cotton
 Roy Coxon
 Phil Dando
 Greg Draper
 Ken France
 Matthew Garbett
 Keith Garland
 Clint Gosling
 Paul Halford
 Peter Hall
 Brian Hardman
 Jason Hicks
 David Houghton
 Arthur Inglis
 Dan Keat
 Eric Lesbirel
 Tony Levy
 Alan Marley
 Tommy Mason
 Billy McClure
 Ray Mears
 Kevin Mulgrew
 Dave Mulligan
 James Musa
 Geordie Newman
 Paul Nixon
 Doug Ottley
 Graham Pearce
 Vic Pollard
 James Pritchett
 Bob Quickenden
 Tommy Randles
 Chris Riley
 Luke Rowe
 Tommy Smith
 Harry Spencer
 Steve Sumner
 Maurice Tillotson
 Brian Turner
 Alan Vest
 Colin Walker
 Steve Wooddin
 Billy Wright
 Bill Zuill

Germany 
 Shane Smeltz

Greece 
 Themistoklis Tzimopoulos

Hungary 
 Julius Beck
 Imre Kiss
 Istvan Nemet

India 
 Praven Jeram

Ireland 
 Sean Byrne
 Tommy Farnan
 Matt Guildea
 Tom McCabe

Kenya 
 John Legg

Malaysia 
 Declan Edge

Netherlands 
 Willem de Graaf
 Nando Pijnaker
 Frits Poelman
 Benjamin van den Broek

Northern Ireland 
 Noel Barkley
 Jim Bell
 Tony Ferris
 John Hill

Papua New Guinea 
 Tinoi Christie

Samoa 
 Rodney Reid

Scotland 
 Jock Aird
 George Anderson
 Allan Boath
 Alex Caldwell
 Jim Christie
 George Cuthill
 Sandy Davie
 Grahame Davis
 Adrian Elrick
 Jim Ferrier
 Iain Gillies
 Iain Hastie
 Bill Hume
 Ken Ironside
 Murray Kay
 Joe Kissock
 George Lamont
 Andy Leslie
 Sam Malcolmson
 Iain Marshall
 Neil McArthur
 Jim McDougall
 Tom McNab
 Paddy McFarlane
 Duncan McVey
 Tom Methven
 Tony Moynihan
 Keith Nelson
 Jock Newall
 Bert Ormond
 Alf Stamp
 Charlie Steele Sr.
 Alex Stenhouse
 Joe Todd

South Africa 
 Ryan De Vries
 Daniel Ellensohn
 Storm Roux
 Deklan Wynne

Switzerland 
 Alex Rufer

United States 
 Kip Colvey

List by country of birth 
England is the country where most of foreign-born New Zealand players were born.

References

External links
All Whites lineups at Ultimate NZ Soccer
Caps and goals of players representing New Zealand at Ultimate NZ Soccer

born outside
Lists of expatriate association football players
Association football player non-biographical articles
Immigration to New Zealand
Change of nationality in sport